The hoary comma (Polygonia gracilis) is a species of butterfly, common in boreal North America from Alaska, across southern Canada to New England and the Maritime Provinces and south to New Mexico from the Rocky Mountains to the Pacific Ocean. The wings have a distinctive ragged edge.

Adult butterflies feed on tree sap and nectar from sweet everlasting (Gnaphalium) as well as other flowers. Caterpillars feed on shrub leaves including currant (Ribes), western azalea (Rhododendron occidentale) and mock azalea (Rhododendron menziesii).

The species survives the winter in the adult stage in diapause and mate and lay eggs in the spring. Butterflies emerge from their chrysalids in midsummer.

References

External links

Hoary Comma, Butterflies of Canada

Nymphalini
Butterflies of North America
Butterflies described in 1867
Taxa named by Augustus Radcliffe Grote
Taxa named by Coleman Townsend Robinson